Maximum engineering data rate (MEDR) is a term primarily used by telephone companies to refer to the maximum data throughput supportable over targeted copper wire.

MEDR is actually a theoretical measure of the amount of data throughput a line can handle, but does not necessarily refer to the amount of data available to the customer at the end of said copper wiring.  The data throughput that can actually be presented to the end user is measured by AIDR or As Is Data Rate.

MEDR automatically assumes that the copper wiring in question is groomed to the best available capacity and needs no further work and is an optimistic estimate of what can be achieved over the wire.

Telephony